Wiggins is an unincorporated community in Summers County, West Virginia, United States. Wiggins is located on the north bank of the Greenbrier River, east of Hinton.

References

Unincorporated communities in Summers County, West Virginia
Unincorporated communities in West Virginia